The Ohio–Indiana League was a Class D level minor league baseball league that operated from 1948 to 1951. The league was composed of six teams from Ohio and two teams from Indiana. There was also a six–team Ohio–Indiana League in 1907, with unknown standings.

Cities represented
Bluffton, IN: Bluffton 1907 
Decatur, IN: Decatur 1907
Kokomo, IN - Sharpesville, IN: Kokomo–Sharpesville 1907
Lima, OH: Lima Terriers 1948; Lima Chiefs 1949; Lima Phillies 1950–1951
Marion, OH: Marion Cubs 1948; Marion Red Sox 1949–1951
Muncie, IN: Muncie Reds 1948–1950 
Newark, OH: Newark Yankees 1948–1951 
Portland, IN: Portland 1907
Portsmouth, OH: Portsmouth A's 1948–1950
Richmond, IN: Richmond 1907; Richmond Roses 1948; Richmond Tigers 1949–1951
Springfield, OH: Springfield Giants 1948–1951
Van Wert, OH: Van Wert 1907
Zanesville, OH: Zanesville Dodgers 1948; Zanesville Indians 1949–1950

Standings & statistics
1948 Ohio–Indiana League
 Playoffs - Zanesville Dodgers 4 games Springfield Giants 0; Playoffs - Muncie Packers 4 games Portsmouth A's 0Finals - Zanesville Dodgers 4 games Muncie Packers 2

1949 Ohio–Indiana League 
Playoffs - Marion Red Sox 3 games Portsmouth A's 1; Playoffs - Muncie Reds 3 games Springfield Giants 1Finals - Marion Red Sox 4 games Muncie Reds 3

1950 Ohio–Indiana League 
Playoffs - Marion Red Sox 3 games Springfield Giants 1;Playoffs - Newark Yankees 3 games Richmond Tigers 2Finals - Marion Red Sox 4 games Newark Yankees 0 

1951 Ohio–Indiana League
Newark won the first half which ended June 18. Newark folded July 17 and the second half was started over, won by Marion. The Springfield Giants were a playoff qualifier.
Playoffs - Marion Red Sox 4 games Springfield Giants 0

References

External links
Baseball Reference
Ohio-Indiana League chart

Baseball leagues in Ohio
Defunct minor baseball leagues in the United States
Baseball in Indiana
Sports leagues established in 1948
Sports leagues disestablished in 1951
Sports leagues established in 1907
Sports leagues disestablished in 1907